The following is a list of the MTV Europe Music Award winners and nominees for Best Japanese Act.

Winners and nominees
Winners are listed first and highlighted in bold.

2010s

2020s

See also
 MTV Video Music Awards Japan

References

Japanese Act
Awards established in 2013
Japanese music awards